Matthew Askin (born 24 December 1988) is a British former professional boxer who competed from 2008 to 2018. He held the British cruiserweight title from 2017 to 2018 and challenged once for the Commonwealth cruiserweight title in 2015.

Amateur career
Askin boxed for the Pool of Life Amateur Boxing Club and was crowned the 2008 Senior ABA champion at cruiserweight.

Professional career
Askin turned professional in November 2008 after signing with promoter Steve Wood and defeated Paul Bonson at The Tower Ballroom in Blackpool.

In January 2009 he signed with promoter Ricky Hatton and has since taken his record to 11 wins without defeat.

During 2011 Sky Sports short listed Askin as a prospect to watch in 2011.

In March 2011 he won his first title as a professional by knocking out Neil Dawson in six rounds in Wigan. Askin is the former undefeated Central Area Cruiserweight Champion.

Askin vs. Glowacki 
In November 2012 Askin has lost by KO to WBO Cruiserweight champion Krzysztof Glowacki.

Askin vs. Edwards 
In March 2014, Askin successfully defended his English Cruiserweight title against Londoner Menay Edwards.

Askin vs. Kennedy 
On 26 May 2017, Askin stopped Craig Kennedy in the sixth round to become British cruiserweight champion.

Askin vs. Simmons 
In his next fight, Askin defended his British cruiserweight title against Stephen Simmons. Askin finished Simmons within two rounds.

Askin vs. Okolie 
In his following fight, Askin fought undefeated contender Lawrence Okolie, who was ranked #15 by the WBA at the time. Okolie won the fight on all three scorecards, 116-110, 114-113 and 114-112.

Professional boxing record

References

External links 

 Official Matty Askin Boxing Website
 Matty Askin - Profile, News Archive & Current Rankings at Box.Live

1988 births
Living people
English male boxers
Cruiserweight boxers
Sportspeople from Barnsley